Itautec is a Brazilian electronics company that was  founded in 1979. The company is part of Itaúsa, a large Brazilian business group.

Itautec. is a well-known ATM, kiosk, and computer manufacturer in the Brazilian and South American market, and also has a key role in project deployment and IT services.

Itautec makes consumer electronics, banking and retail automation. The company has a large base of ATMs Globally and in Latin America. Headquartered in São Paulo and with a manufacturing plant in the city of Jundiaí (SP), Itautec has 5,709 direct employees – 5,285 in Brazil and 424 abroad.

Product lines
Presently the company's product lines include:

 Personal Computers: desktop, tablet and laptop personal computers
 Monitors: LCD, LED, OLED and touch screen monitors
 Commercial and Banking Automation
 Software: Point of sale, credit card processing, an in-house Linux distribution called Librix, terminal management, digital signatures, and banking correspondence, among others
 Services and Integration: Technical support, infrastructure, security, phone support, servers, and networks
 Components: Printed circuit boards, Memory boards, and integrated circuits

History

1980 – First online presence as GRI Gerenciador de Redes Itautec "Itautec Network Services Provider" and Banktec mainframes.

1981 – Central agency of Itaú is founded, including an automation system developed by Itautec.

1982 – Bank of Brazil installs GRI and Banktec

1985 – PC/XT microcomputer launched

1986 – Itautec installs the first compact Automated teller machine

1989 – GRIP (Gerenciamento de Redes Itautec para PC "Itautec Network Management for PCs") is launched

1990 – Launch of a first Notebook computer, IS 386 Note

1994 – Itautec launches a second-generation ATM in Brazil

1995 – First version of Banktec Multicanal in Banco Itaú Argentina

2001 – First ATMs exported to United States/Europe

2002 – Itautec acquires technology from NMD for DelaRue, and installs the first WEB system in Banco Itaú Buen Ayre.

2009 – Itautec ranks in the 24th position in Fintech ranking, that lists the world's largest IT providers.

2011 – Itautec debuts world’s first touchless 3D ATM.

See also
 SISNE plus

Sources
 American Banker article: "ATM's Hologram Interface Deters Theft"
 Credit Union Journal article: "First Touchscreen 3D ATM Launched for CUMarket"

References

External links
 Itautec home page

Itaúsa
Technology companies of Brazil
Electronics companies of Brazil
Manufacturing companies based in São Paulo
Computer companies established in 1979
Software companies established in 1979
Computer hardware companies
Display technology companies
Financial technology companies
Point of sale companies
Software companies of Brazil
Brazilian brands
Companies listed on B3 (stock exchange)